Golden Knights may refer to:

United States Army Parachute Team, commonly known as the "Golden Knights"
Vegas Golden Knights, a National Hockey League team 
Golden Knights (chess), the US's annual correspondence chess tournament
"Golden Knights", pre-2007 name for the UCF Knights
Clarkson Golden Knights, Clarkson University's athletics teams
"Golden Knights", the College of Saint Rose's athletics teams
"Golden Knights", James Madison High School (Brooklyn)'s athletics teams

See also
 Golden (disambiguation)
 Knight (disambiguation)
 The Golden Knight, 1970 Hong Kong film
 Gold Coast Knights SC, soccer team in Gold Coast, Queensland, Australia
 Ghosts 'n Goblins: Gold Knights, two video games, "Gold Knights I" and "Gold Knights II" in the Ghosts 'n Goblins game series